In molecular biology mir-744 microRNA is a short RNA molecule. MicroRNAs function to regulate the expression levels of other genes by several mechanisms.

miR-744 and cancer in mice
miR-744 plays a role in tumour development and growth in mouse cell lines. Its expression induces cyclin B1 expression, whilst knockdown sees a resultant decreased level of mouse cyclin B through the Ccnb1 gene. Short-term overexpression of miR-744 in mouse cell lines has been seen to enhance cell proliferation, whilst chromosomal instability and in vivo suppression are concurrent with a prolonged expression.

TGF-β1 repression
Multiple miR-744 binding sites have been identified in the proximal 3' untranslated region of transforming growth factor beta 1 (TGF-β1). Direct targeting of TGF-β1 by miR-744 has been identified, and transfection is seen to inhibit endogenous TGF-β1 synthesis by directing post-transcriptional regulation.

EEF1A2 repression
miR-744 directly targets translation elongation factor and known protooncogene EEF1A2. mIR-744 also upregulates during resveratrol treatment of MCF7 breast cancer cells.

See also 
 MicroRNA

References

Further reading

External links
 

MicroRNA
MicroRNA precursor families